Tatarsky Klyuch is a rural locality (a settlement) in Zaigrayevsky District, Republic of Buryatia, Russia. The population was 1,863 as of 2010. There are 15 streets.

Geography 
Tatarsky Klyuch is located 23 km southeast of Zaigrayevo (the district's administrative centre) by road. Ilka is the nearest rural locality.

References 

Rural localities in Zaigrayevsky District